Eksen Research is a Turkish market research and fieldwork agency. The company started to operate in 2004. It is a member of several international market research associations such as ESOMAR, BIG and The Research Alliance.

Its central office is located in Istanbul, Turkey. The company is among the first companies that implement online market research methodologies in Turkey. Its fieldwork coverage has included the Middle Eastern, Asia Pacific and African countries.

Eksen recently contributed to the book Handbook of Global User Research for Turkey section.

References

External links
 Eksen Research Website

Market research companies of Turkey
Research and analysis firms